is a Japanese sport shooter who competed in the 1964 Summer Olympics and in the 1976 Summer Olympics.

References

External links
 

1932 births
Possibly living people
Japanese male sport shooters
Trap and double trap shooters
Olympic shooters of Japan
Shooters at the 1964 Summer Olympics
Shooters at the 1976 Summer Olympics
Shooters at the 1974 Asian Games
Asian Games medalists in shooting
Asian Games gold medalists for Japan
Medalists at the 1974 Asian Games
20th-century Japanese people